The Community of Sahel–Saharan States (CEN-SAD;; French: Communauté des Etats Sahélo-Sahariens; Portuguese: Comunidade dos Estados Sahelo-Saarianos) aims to create a free trade area within a region of Africa. There are questions with regard to whether its level of economic integration qualifies it under the enabling clause of the General Agreement on Tariffs and Trade (GATT).

Establishment 
CEN-SAD was established in February 1998 by six countries, but since then its membership has grown to 29. One of its main goals is to achieve economic unity through the implementation of the free movement of people and goods in order to make the area occupied by member states a free trade area. At the international level, CEN-SAD gained observer status at the UN General Assembly in 2001 and concluded association and cooperation accords with the United Nations Economic Commission for Africa (ECA) and with UN specialized agencies and institutions such as UNDP, WHO, UNESCO, FAO, and the Permanent Interstate Committee for drought control in the Sahel.

All CEN-SAD member countries are also participating in other African economic unions, that have the aim to create a common African Economic Community. The envisioned Free Trade Area of CEN-SAD would be hard to practically implement, because it is overlapping with the envisioned customs unions of the Economic Community of West African States (ECOWAS/CEDEAO), ECCAS and COMESA and other trade blocs more advanced in their integration.

2005 summit 
At the summit of 1–2 June 2005 in Ouagadougou (Burkina Faso), the heads of state decided to create a "high authority for water, agriculture and seeds" in order to allow member countries to develop their agriculture through better control of water resources and seed selection. On the other hand, the summit to decide to study the construction of a railway line connecting Libya, Chad, Niger, with ramps to Burkina Faso, Mali and Senegal, to facilitate exchanges and to open up the CEN-SAD space. Blaise Compaoré, president of Burkina Faso, succeeded Malian President Amadou Toumani Toure as current president of CEN-SAD.

2007 summit 
The African leaders sought to reconcile differences between neighbours Chad and Sudan over the Darfur conflict and boost Somalia's embattled Transitional Federal Government at a regional summit in Libya on June 3, 2007.

2008 summit 
The 10th Summit of Heads of State of the Community of Sahel–Saharan States (CEN-SAD) met on June 28, 2008 in Cotonou on June 18. Its theme was Rural Development and Food Security in the CEN-SAD area. Beninese President Yayi Boni has been elected current President of CEN-SAD for a one-year term.

2013 summit 
In January 2013, the Community of Sahel–Saharan States will meet in N'Djamena, Chad. A commentator said "Morocco will likely continue its steps to take command of the organization".

CEN-SAD Games 

Beginning in 2009, CEN-SAD member states will take part in planned periodic international sporting and cultural festivals, known as the Community of Sahel–Saharan States Games (Jeux de la Communauté des Etats Sahélo-Sahariens).  The first CEN-SAD Games were held in Niamey, Niger from 4–14 February 2009. Thirteen nations competed in Under-20 sports (athletics, basketball, judo, football, handball, table tennis and traditional wrestling) and six fields of cultural competition (song, traditional creation and inspiration dancing, painting, sculpture and photography).  The second CEN-SAD Games was scheduled to take place in the Chadian capitol of N’Djamena in February 2011.

List of members

References

External links 
 CEN-SAD website
 CEN-SAD at the African Union website.

African Union
Trade blocs
United Nations General Assembly observers
Organizations established in 1998
Intergovernmental organizations established by treaty
1998 establishments in Africa